Amelia Earhart Peak is a summit in Tuolumne County, California, in the United States.

The summit was named in the 1960s for aviator Amelia Earhart.

References

Mountains of Yosemite National Park
Mountains of Tuolumne County, California
Mountains of Northern California
Monuments and memorials to Amelia Earhart